The 2015–16 season of the Bermudian Premier Division (also known as the Cingular Wireless Premier Division for sponsorship reasons) is the 53rd season of top-tier football in Bermuda. It started on 27 September 2015 and finished on 10 April 2016. Somerset Trojans were the defending champions, having won their 10th top tier title last season. Dandy Town Hornets won their 8th title this season.

Changes from 2014–15
At the end of the 2014–15 season, Flanagan's Onions and St. George's Colts were relegated after finishing 9th and 10th in the competition. They were replaced by the champions and runners-up of the First Division, Boulevard Blazers and Devonshire Colts.

Teams

Table

Results

References

External links 
Bermuda FA
Soccerway
RSSSF

Bermudian Premier Division seasons
Bermuda
1